Amygdalies ("almond trees") is the name of two settlements in Greece:

 Amygdalies, Grevena, a village in Grevena
 Amygdalies, Elis, a village in Andritsaina-Krestena